Oceanair  was a regional airline that was based at Luis Muñoz Marín International Airport in San Juan, Puerto Rico. It competed on domestic routes with Prinair; and on routes to the Virgin Islands with Prinair and with Aero Virgin Islands; using propeller-driven aircraft.

The airline flew from the late 1970s, when it started flying as Trans Commuter Airline, to the mid-1980s.

According to the Oceanair February 15, 1982 system timetable, the airline operated up to thirteen flights a day between San Juan and St. Thomas, up to nine flights a day between San Juan and St. Croix, and two flights a day between St. Thomas and St. Croix.  The airline was operating 40-passenger Fairchild F-27s and 10-passenger Beechcraft Queen Airs at this time.

Fleet

The fleet consisted of Fairchild F-27 and CASA 212 turboprops as well as Beechcraft Queen Air piston-engine light aircraft.

See also
 List of defunct airlines of the United States
 Aeronaves de Puerto Rico

References

External links
 Timetable images
 AirTimes timetables

Defunct airlines of Puerto Rico
Airlines of Puerto Rico